Crooked Creek is a stream in Ralls County in the U.S. state of Missouri. It is a tributary of Bear Creek.

The stream flows east crossing under Route HH and then turns to the north again passing under Route HH.

Crooked Creek was so named on account of frequent meanders on its course.

See also
List of rivers of Missouri

References

Rivers of Ralls County, Missouri
Rivers of Missouri